Palau has a bicameral legislature, the Palau National Congress, consisting of the House of Delegates and the Senate of Palau, which both sit at the capitol complex in Ngerulmud, Melekeok State. The House of Delegates has 16 members, each serving four-year terms in single-seat constituencies. The Senate has 13 members, also serving four-year terms in multi-seat constituencies. In the last elections, held in 2020, only non-partisans were elected; no political parties exist.

The congress is called Olbiil Era Kelulau (OEK) in Palauan or “House of Whispered Decisions". When it was founded, there were 18 senators. That number of them was changed in 1984 to 14. The number of senators changed again in 2000, when it was reduced drastically to 9. In 2008, it was raised once again, to 13.

In 2018, the Senate President was Hokkons Baules, and Speaker was Sabino Anastacio.

List of elections
 1980 Palauan general election
1984 Palauan general election
1988 Palauan general election
1992 Palauan general election
1996 Palauan general election
2000 Palauan general election
2004 Palauan general election
2008 Palauan general election
2012 Palauan general election
2016 Palauan general election
2020 Palauan general election

Palau Congressional Library
Housed at the Palau National Congress, the Palau Congressional Library was founded on August 18, 1981. Headed as of 1996 by Congressional Librarian Harry Besebes, it has a 3000 item collection, with annual accessions of 350. The library employs 2 staff members, both professional librarians.

See also
 Politics of Palau
Congress of the Trust Territory of the Pacific Islands
 List of legislatures by country

References

External links
Palau National Congress

 
Palau
Politics of Palau
Political organizations based in Palau
Palau
1980 establishments in Palau